The Hurricane Horseman is a 1931 American Western film directed by Armand Schaefer and starring Lane Chandler, Marie Quillan and Walter Miller. It was shot at the Iverson Ranch.

Cast
 Lane Chandler as 'Gun' Smith 
 Marie Quillan as Tonita 
 Walter Miller as Pancho Gomez 
 Yakima Canutt as Sheriff Jones 
 Richard Alexander as Bull Carter - Henchman 
 Lafe McKee as Don Roberto 
 Charles Schaeffer as Cinco - Henchman
 Slim Whitaker as Pedro - Henchman

References

Bibliography
 Michael R. Pitts. Poverty Row Studios, 1929–1940: An Illustrated History of 55 Independent Film Companies, with a Filmography for Each. McFarland & Company, 2005.

External links
 

1931 films
1931 Western (genre) films
American Western (genre) films
Films directed by Armand Schaefer
1930s English-language films
1930s American films